Preston Township may refer to the following townships in the United States:

 Preston Township, Richland County, Illinois
 Preston Township, Fillmore County, Minnesota
 Preston Township, Platte County, Missouri
 Preston Township, Wayne County, Pennsylvania

See also 
 Preston Lake Township, Renville County, Minnesota